Mediator of RNA polymerase II transcription subunit 21 is an enzyme that in humans is encoded by the MED21 gene.

Interactions
MED21 has been shown to interact with:
 BRCA1, 
 CDK8, 
 GTF2F1,
 GTF2H4, 
 MED6,  and
 POLR2A.

References

Further reading